Aspidura drummondhayi, commonly known as Drummond-Hay's rough-sided snake or කෙටිවල් මැඩිල්ලා  (ketiwal medilla) in Sinhala, is a species of snake in the family Colubridae. The species is endemic to Sri Lanka.

Etymology
The specific name, drummondhayi, is in honor of Henry Maurice Drummond-Hay (1869-1932), who was a planter and naturalist in Ceylon (now Sri Lanka), and who was the son of Scottish ornithologist Colonel Henry Maurice Drummond-Hay (1814-1896).

Geographic range
A. drummondhayi is a burrowing snake from the low hills of southwestern Sri Lanka.

Description
The head of A. drummondhayi is indistinct from the neck, and the body is cylindrical. The dorsum is chocolate-brown with faint mottling. A dark vertebral stripe, one scale wide, runs from the snout to the tail tip. There are two pairs of faint dark stripes on the paravertebral region of each side. The forehead is dark. The venter is light brown with faint mottling.

Scalation
A. drummondhayi has dorsal scales arranged in 15 rows at midbody. Preoculars are absent. There are 2 postoculars which are in contact with the parietal. Ventrals number 113-119. Subcaudals number 18-26.

Reproduction
Drummond-Hay's rough-sided snake is known to lay 4 eggs at a time.

References

External links
 http://reptile-database.reptarium.cz/species?genus=Aspidura&species=drummondhayi
 http://www.wildreach.com/reptile/Serpentes/Aspidura%20drummondhayi.php
 https://www.itis.gov/servlet/SingleRpt/SingleRpt?search_topic=TSN&search_value=700773
 http://eol.org/pages/795708/names?all=1

Further reading
Boulenger GA (1904). "Description of a New Snake". Spolia Zeylanica, Colombo Museum 2: 95-96 + one plate. (Aspidura drummondhayi, new species).
Smith MA (1943). The Fauna of British India, Ceylon and Burma, Including the Whole of the Indo-Chinese Sub-region. Reptilia and Amphibia. Vol. III.—Serpentes. London: Secretary of State for India. (Taylor and Francis, printers). xii + 583 pp. (Aspidura drummondhayi, p. 338).
Wall F (1921). Ophidia Taprobanica or the Snakes of Ceylon. Colombo, Ceylon [Sri Lanka]: Colombo Museum. (H.R. Cottle, Government Printer). xxii + 581 pp. (Aspidura drummondhayi, pp. 213–214).

Aspidura
Reptiles described in 1904
Reptiles of Sri Lanka
Taxa named by George Albert Boulenger